Niilo and Valto Karhumäki, also known as the Karhumäki brothers, were Finnish aviation pioneers, aircraft manufacturers and airline founders.

Born in Multia, Niilo and Valto Karhumäki moved to Jyväskylä, where they founded a company called Veljekset Karhumäki in late 1924, which dealt with pilot training, public displays, aircraft maintenance and aerial photography during the 1930s. In order to start a co-operation with the Finnish Air Force, the headquarters of Veljekset Karhumäki was moved to Kuorevesi. During World War II the company was merged into the Valtion lentokonetehdas company, manufacturer of a number of military aircraft. The Karhumäki brothers designed the Karhumäki Karhu 48B light airplane, of which a small number was produced during the 1950s.

In 1950, Karhumäki Airways was founded by Veljekset Karhumäki, an airline initially offering scheduled passenger flights on mostly domestic routes. In 1963, Aero O/Y (today's Finnair) acquired the majority of its stake, and in 1996 Karair (as it was known by then) was fully absorbed into Finnair.

References
 Ismo Tervonen: VELJEKSET KARHUMÄKI - Suomen ilmailun pioneereina 1924-1956 (Apali 2002) 
 Ismo Tervonen: KAR-AIR - tilauslentoliikenteen edelläkävijänä 1957-1980 (Apali 2004) 
 Ismo Tervonen: KARAIR - matkustajalentoliikenteen perinteiden vaalijana 1980-1996 (Apali 2007)

External links

The Karhumäki brothers

Aircraft manufacturers of Finland
Sibling duos